Valberg (formerly Valdberg) is a former municipality in Nordland county, Norway.  The  municipality existed from 1927 until 1963.  The municipality covered the southeastern coast of the island of Vestvågøya in what is now Vestvågøy Municipality. The administrative centre was the village of Valberg where Valberg Church is located.

History
The municipality of Valberg was created by an acrimonious split from the municipality of Borge in 1927.  The new municipality initially had 625 residents.  During the 1960s, there were many municipal mergers across Norway due to the work of the Schei Committee. On 1 January 1963, Valberg municipality (population: 662) was merged with the neighboring municipalities of Borge (population: 4,056), Buksnes (population: 4,416), and Hol (population: 3,154) to create the new Vestvågøy Municipality.

Name
The municipality (originally the parish) is named after the old Valberg farm ( or ) since the first Valberg Church was built there. The farm was named after a nearby mountain.

Government
While it existed, this municipality was responsible for primary education (through 10th grade), outpatient health services, senior citizen services, unemployment, social services, zoning, economic development, and municipal roads. During its existence, this municipality was governed by a municipal council of elected representatives, which in turn elected a mayor.

Municipal council
The municipal council  of Valberg was made up of representatives that were elected to four year terms.  The party breakdown of the final municipal council was as follows:

See also
List of former municipalities of Norway

References

Vestvågøy
Former municipalities of Norway
1927 establishments in Norway
1963 disestablishments in Norway